Angelo Paradiso (born 14 February 1977) is a former Italian professional footballer. Paradiso spent his career mainly at Serie C1 and Serie C2. He also played 3 Serie A matches.

Biography
Paradiso started his professional career at Teramo. He played two season at Serie C2 before signed by Serie B side S.S.C. Napoli. In 1999, he joined Serie A side Lecce, but in mid-season joined Cesena of Serie B in a co-ownership deal. He followed Cesena relegated to Serie C1, but joined Ravenna of Serie B in mid-season. The team failed to avoid relegation and Paradiso joined Lucchese of Serie C1. After just played 15 league matches in  seasons, he joined league rival Carrarese but faced another relegation. In 2003-04 season, he joined Bellinzona of Italian speaking region of Switzerland. He played only 7 matches at Challenge League and moved to Pisa of Serie C1 then for Chieti. After the relegation of Chieti, he moved to Maltese club Birkirkara and played two matches at 2006–07 UEFA Champions League. He then returned to Italy for Serie D (non-professional, regional league or Italian 5th level).

In 2009, he joined Spanish side Ibiza-Eivissa of Tercera División. But the team later was expelled from the league due to late payment of wages. He followed the team to play at Regional de Ibiza y Formentera (Spanish fifth level).

References

External links

Italian footballers
Italian expatriate footballers
S.S. Lazio players
S.S.C. Napoli players
U.S. Lecce players
Ravenna F.C. players
S.S.D. Lucchese 1905 players
AC Bellinzona players
Pisa S.C. players
S.S. Chieti Calcio players
Birkirkara F.C. players
Serie A players
Serie B players
Expatriate footballers in Switzerland
Expatriate footballers in Malta
Expatriate footballers in Spain
Association football midfielders
Footballers from Rome
1977 births
Living people